Tarzan's Three Challenges is a 1963 British-American adventure film filmed in Metrocolor. It is a follow-up to 1962's Tarzan Goes to India. The film was Jock Mahoney's second and final turn as the apeman, was produced by Sy Weintraub, written by Robert Day and Berne Giler, and directed by Robert Day. The film was released in June 1963.

Plot
Tarzan, of Africa, is summoned to an unnamed Asian country to protect Kashi (Ricky Der), the youthful heir to the throne, from his evil uncle, Gishi Khan, played by Tarzan veteran Woody Strode. Arriving by parachute from a light airplane and armed with a Spanish bolo hunting knife, Tarzan dons monk's robes and travels by boat to a monastery.

The first set of three challenges are for Tarzan to prove he is worthy to be accepted into Kashi's service. First is an archery contest to test his skill. Then Tarzan stands between two tall posts, grasps handles which are attached to two ropes which run over the top of each post and are attached to buffalo. When the buffalo are driven apart, Tarzan is lifted into the air and stretched to test his strength. He passes the test by not letting go of either handle. Third, he is asked to answer a question designed to test his wisdom.

The second set of three challenges are for the young new leader, Kashi. First he must choose the correct diamond out of three. Second he must choose an empty goblet out of three. Last, he must choose one urn of ashes of the deceased previous leader out of five. After passing all three tests, Khan then comes forward and demands that Kashi take the fourth test of three challenges of life or death combat events called "The Challenge Of Might" which haven't been invoked in a thousand years. The boy chooses Tarzan as his defender, which Tarzan accepts.

Tarzan and Khan battle each other in two of the challenge events of the fourth test which concludes with the third and final challenge event with each man fighting with swords on a wide mesh net suspended above large vats of boiling oil in which Khan dies by falling through the net into one of the boiling vats.

Cast
 Jock Mahoney as Tarzan 
 Woody Strode as Khan / Dying Leader 
 Tsu Kobayashi as Cho San, Prince's Nursemaid 
 Earl Cameron as Mang 
 Jimmy Jamal 
 Salah Jamal as Hani 
 Anthony Chinn as Tor 
 Robert Hu as Nari 
 Christopher Carlos as Sechung 
 Ricky Der as Kashi

Production notes
The film was filmed near Bangkok, Thailand and in the jungle near the Chiang Mai Province. Some scenes were shot in the Temple of Buddha's Footprint, the first film ever granted permission to shoot at this holy site. Crew members and cast removed their shoes and shot in almost total silence.

Midway through the film, Mahoney contracted dysentery, dengue fever and finally pneumonia. Some critics, noting how thin and weary he appeared in some action scenes, said it undermined the film’s credibility. English Stuntman Ray Austin made the  dive for Mahoney at Begor Bridge. Forty-four years and four months old when the film was released, Jock Mahoney became the oldest actor to portray the apeman, a record that still stands.

See also
List of American films of 1963

References

Notes

Bibliography
Essoe, Gabe. Tarzan of the Movies, 1968, The Citadel Press.

External links
 
 
 
 ERBzine Silver Screen: Tarzan's Three Challenges

1963 films
1960s fantasy adventure films
American fantasy adventure films
American sequel films
British fantasy adventure films
British sequel films
Films directed by Robert Day
Films set in Asia
Films shot in Thailand
Metro-Goldwyn-Mayer films
Tarzan films
Films produced by Sy Weintraub
1960s English-language films
1960s American films
1960s British films